The Macanese pataca or Macau pataca (sign: $; abbreviation: P; ISO code: MOP) is the currency of the Macau Special Administrative Region of the People's Republic of China. It is subdivided into 100 avos (sin), with 10 avos called ho in Cantonese.

Macau has a currency board system under which the pataca is 100 per cent backed by foreign exchange reserves, in this case currently the Hong Kong dollar (itself backed by the United States dollar). Moreover, the currency board, Monetary Authority of Macau (AMCM), has a statutory obligation to issue and redeem Macau pataca on demand against the Hong Kong dollar at a fixed exchange rate of HK$1 = MOP 1.03, and without limit.

History 

The Spanish American silver dollar was in wide use in Asia and the Americas between the 16th to 20th centuries, and was imported by China in large quantities. They were typically minted in Mexico and then brought to the Philippines as part of the Spanish East Indies through the Manila-Acapulco Galleon Trade to be traded and circulated across the Far East. It was known to the Portuguese as the pataca mexicana. At the end of the 19th century various versions of this silver dollar or pataca were in use in Macau, in the form of Spanish dollars, the British trade dollars of Hong Kong and the Straits Settlements, as well as the silver dollars and fractional coinage of the neighbouring province of Canton.

In 1894, the pataca was introduced as a unit of account in Portuguese Macau and Portuguese Timor at a rate of 1 pataca = 450 réis, equivalent to the Mexican Peso or Philippine Peso. In 1901, it was decided to have a uniquely Macau currency, and for that purpose, the Banco Nacional Ultramarino was granted exclusive rights to issue legal tender banknotes that were to be denominated in patacas. On January 27, 1906, pataca notes in denominations of 1, 5, 50 and 100 were introduced and all foreign coinage was outlawed, the idea being to make the pataca paper notes the sole legal tender currency in Macau. However, the Chinese, being so accustomed to using silver for barter, were suspicious of this new paper money, and as such, the paper pataca always circulated at a discount in relation to the silver dollar coins. On the contrary, a similar action at exactly the same time in the Straits Settlements, and for the same purpose, had the different effect of putting the new Straits dollar into the gold exchange standard. Hence both the Macau pataca and the Straits dollar were launched at a sterling value of 2 shillings and 4 pence, but where the Straits dollar remained at that value until the 1960s, the Macau pataca fluctuated with the value of silver, just like the Hong Kong unit.

In 1935, when Hong Kong and China abandoned the silver standard, the Hong Kong unit was pegged to sterling at a rate of 1 shilling and 3 pence, while the Macau pataca was pegged to the Portuguese escudo at a rate of MOP 1 = Esc 5$50. This meant that the Macau pataca was worth only 1 shilling and was therefore at a discount of 3 pence in relation to the Hong Kong unit.

The first exclusively Macau coinage was not introduced until the year 1952, which happened to be the year after the last pataca fractional coins were minted for East Timor. In that year in Macau, denominations below 10 patacas were replaced by coins.

In 1980, the Macau government set up the Issuing Institute of Macau (Instituto Emissor de Macau; abbr. as IEM), which was given the monopoly right to issue pataca notes. The BNU became the IEM's agent bank and continued to issue banknotes. On agreement with the BNU on October 16, 1995, the Macau branch of Bank of China became the second note-issuing bank. The authority to issue patacas was transferred to the Monetary Authority of Macau.

Coins 
Coins were not issued for use in Macau until 1952, with the 20 cent coin of Canton Province circulating. In 1952, bronze 5 and 10 avos, cupro-nickel 50 avos and .720 fineness silver 1 and 5 patacas were introduced. Nickel-brass replaced bronze in 1967, including the last issue of 5 avos. Nickel replaced silver in the 1 pataca in 1968. In 1971, a final (.650 fineness) silver issue of 5 patacas was produced.

Brass 10, 20 and 50 avos and cupro-nickel 1 and 5 patacas were introduced in 1982. The 20 avos and 5 patacas became dodecagonal in 1993 and 1992, respectively, whilst a bimetallic 10 patacas was introduced in 1997 and a cupronickel 2 patacas in 1998. Coins are issued by the Monetary Authority of Macau.

Banknotes 

In a similar arrangement to the issue of banknotes in Hong Kong, Macau's banknotes are not issued by a central bank or monetary authority but by two commercial banks, the Banco Nacional Ultramarino and the Bank of China. Owing to Macau's Portuguese colonial past, banknotes are printed in Portuguese as well as Chinese, including the name of the Bank of China which is written as both "Banco da China" and "".

Following the initial issues of pataca banknotes in 1906, the new currency was supplemented the following year by 10 and 25 pataca notes, and in February 1920, 5, 10 and 50 avo notes were added. In 1923, the Banco Vui Hang introduced 10 pataca notes which stated that they were backed by Cantonese 20 cent coins. These notes were followed until 1934 by cashier's cheques issued by various banks in denominations of 1, 5, 10, 50, 100, 200, 400, 800 and 1,000 dollars, presumably equivalent to the pataca. The BNU issues were augmented by 1 and 20 avo notes in 1942, and in 1944, 500 pataca notes were introduced. Also in 1944, further cashier's cheques were issued, denominated 1,000 yuan and NC$5,000. The 25 pataca note was discontinued after 1958.

On August 8, 1988, BNU issued a 1000 pataca banknote, the highest value banknote yet. Because 8 in Chinese (ba) is similar to "getting rich" (fa), this unique date, which occurs only once per century, gives the note a special meaning. Another feature is the replacement of the Coat of arms of Portugal with BNU's logo, shedding a political symbol in the prospect of reunification with China. In 1995, the Bank of China introduced notes in denominations of 10, 50, 100, 500 and 1000 patacas. Both the BNU and Banco of China introduced 20 pataca notes in 1996.

Current issue 
Banknotes are currently issued in denominations of 10, 20, 50, 100, 500 and 1,000 patacas. The current series of BNU banknotes was issued in 2005, while the Bank of China notes were last issued between 1995 and 2003. The dimensions of the banknotes are the same as that of Hong Kong banknotes worth the corresponding number of dollars. On December 20, 1999, the day Macau was retroceded to China, banknotes of all values (except for 10 patacas) by both banks were reissued with that date. On January 5, 2009, the Monetary Authority of Macau announced a new series of banknotes, dated 2008, released by the Bank of China.

Commemorative issues 
In 2008, the Macau branch of the Bank of China issued four million 20 pataca banknotes in commemoration of the 29th Summer Olympic Games in Beijing.

In 2012, the Banco Nacional Ultramarino and Banco da China issued ten million 10 pataca banknotes to commemorate the Year of the Dragon, and from 2012 to 2023, the Banco National Ultramarino and the Banco da China are each authorized to issue a maximum number of 20 million special notes with the face value of 10 patacas to mark each lunar new year. The Bank of China also issued a 100 pataca banknote to commemorate its centennial anniversary.

In commemoration of the 20th anniversary of the transfer of Macau to the People's Republic of China, the Banco Nacional Ultramarino and the Banco da China issued five million 20 patacas banknotes. The front side of the notes feature the 7-ton gilded bronze sculpture "Lotus Flower In Full Bloom", representing the prosperity of Macau. The back side of the notes feature the Hong Kong-Zhuhai-Macao Bridge.

Exchange rate 

Despite the fact that the pataca is the official currency of Macau, most of the money in circulation in the Region is actually Hong Kong dollars. Patacas accounted for only 29.9% of Macau's money supply at the end of 1998.
The exchange rate is pegged and is approximately MOP 1.03 for HK$1, and Hong Kong dollar banknotes and coins are generally accepted at par or MOP 1.00 for retail payments. For United States dollars, to which the Hong Kong dollar is in turn loosely pegged, the exchange rate is around MOP 8 to 1 US dollar. Although it is possible to exchange patacas in Macau, it is either difficult or impossible to do so elsewhere. The few places in Hong Kong where patacas are available are concentrated on Cleverly Street in Central, a short distance from the Hong Kong–Macau Ferry Terminal.

Although the pataca is the legal tender of Macau, the Hong Kong dollar is almost universally acceptable in the region, and in some cases, is preferred to the pataca. Circulation of the pataca is mandated by a decree (Decreto-Lei n.º 16/95/M) prohibiting refusal by merchants, but some casinos flout this rule and refuse bets in patacas. The Hong Kong dollar and Chinese yuan are generally accepted throughout Macau from casinos to restaurants. Payments to government agencies can also be made in both Hong Kong dollars and patacas.

As Macau currently imposes no restrictions on the import or export of local or foreign currency, visitors can change their currency in hotels, banks and bureaux de change located all around the city including 24 hour currency exchange booths at Macau International Airport (Taipa Island) and at the Lisboa Hotel (Macau Peninsula) for customers if they want to change their currency into patacas outside working hours.

See also 
 Economy of Macau
 Portuguese Timorese pataca

References

Citations

Sources 

 All MOP exchange rates after 1990 are according to the historical China Statistical Yearbook.

External links 

 Abdullah Beydoun's Banknoteworld:  Macau – a gallery of Macau banknote issues past and present
  Banco Nacional Ultramarino (Macau)
  Banknotes issued by the Banco Nacional Ultramarino.
  Bank of China (Macau)
  SinoBanknote
 Historical banknotes of Macau

Fixed exchange rate
Economy of Macau
Currencies with multiple banknote issuers
Currencies of Macau
Currencies introduced in 1894
Currencies introduced in 1906
1894 establishments in Asia
1906 establishments in Macau